The Mexican water mouse, Mexican fishing mouse  or Goodwin's water mouse (Rheomys mexicanus), is a species of semiaquatic rodent in the family Cricetidae. It has a restricted range in the state of Oaxaca in southern Mexico, Threatened by deforestation and water pollution, it is listed as Endangered by the International Union for Conservation of Nature (IUCN).

Taxonomy
The Mexican water mouse was first described as Rheomys mexicanus in 1959 by the American zoologist George Gilbert Goodwin. He was the assistant curator of mammals at the American Museum of Natural History in New York City, and went on a number of collecting expeditions, including one to Iran in 1938.

Distribution
The species is endemic to Mexico and has a very restricted range in the state of Oaxaca on the Pacific slope of the mountains, being known from sites in the vicinity of San Pablo Guelatao, San José Lachiguirí, Unión Hidalgo and Tehuantepec.

Ecology
This rodent is found in and near the headwater streams of rivers in tropical forested areas. Its natural history is poorly known, but it seems to rely on finding its food in the small streams among closed canopy forests in which it lives. Other members of Rheomys are also semiaquatic, with carnivorous diets and similar riparian habitats.

Status
It has a habitat requirement for pure, unpolluted water, and the quality and quantity of suitable habitat is declining. This habitat is under threat from deforestation and from water pollution, including from such human activities as household clothes-washing. As a result of these threats, the International Union for Conservation of Nature has listed the conservation status of this mouse as "endangered".

References

Endemic mammals of Mexico
Mexican water mouse
Mammals described in 1959
Taxonomy articles created by Polbot